In Greek mythology, Pontoporeia, Pontoporea or Pontopereia (Ancient Greek:  Ποντοπόρεια means 'the seafarer') was the Nereid of sea-crossing and one of the 50 marine-nymph daughters of the 'Old Man of the Sea' Nereus and the Oceanid Doris.

Notes

References 

 Hard, Robin, The Routledge Handbook of Greek Mythology: Based on H.J. Rose's "Handbook of Greek Mythology", Psychology Press, 2004, . Google Books.
Hesiod, Theogony from The Homeric Hymns and Homerica with an English Translation by Hugh G. Evelyn-White, Cambridge, MA.,Harvard University Press; London, William Heinemann Ltd. 1914. Online version at the Perseus Digital Library. Greek text available from the same website.
 Kerényi, Carl, The Gods of the Greeks, Thames and Hudson, London, 1951.

Nereids